Tatjana Medved née Popov (born March 13, 1974, in Novi Sad) is a former Serbian handball player. She was captain of the Serbian national team.

Achievements
Kometal Gjorče Petrov Skopje
Macedonian League (2)
Macedonian Cup (2)
EHF Women's Champions League: Quarterfinalist

Milar L'Eliana
ABF League (3)
Copa de la Reina (1)
 Copas de la Liga ABF (3)
 Super Copas de le Liga ABF (3)
EHF Women's Champions League: Runner-up 2002/03

Metz
Campeon de la Liga (1)

BM Sagunto
ABF League (1)

Cem. la Union-Ribarroja
ABF League (2)
Copa de la Reina (1)
 Super Copa de le Liga ABF (1)

ŽRK Zaječar
Superliga (1)

Individual awards
 2005 Mediterranean Games - Top goalscorer

References

External links
EHF profile
Official Site

Living people
1974 births
Sportspeople from Novi Sad
Serbian female handball players
Competitors at the 1997 Mediterranean Games
Competitors at the 2005 Mediterranean Games
Mediterranean Games silver medalists for Serbia
Expatriate handball players
Serbian expatriate sportspeople in North Macedonia
Serbian expatriate sportspeople in Spain
Serbian expatriate sportspeople in France
Mediterranean Games medalists in handball